Rich Valley or Richvalley may refer to some places in Canada and the United States:

Rich Valley, Alberta, Canada, a hamlet
Richvalley, Indiana, US, an unincorporated community
Rich Valley, Minnesota, US, a former community within present-day Rosemount
Rich Valley, Virginia, US, a rural area in Smyth County
Rich Valley Township, McLeod County, Minnesota, US